is a 2002 Japanese jidaigeki film directed by Kihachi Okamoto.
 
Vengeance for Sale is a remake of the TV movie directed by Kihachi Okamoto in 1969, based on the manga written by Okamoto under the pen name "Daisuke Ikuta". The film is last film Kihachi Okamoto directed. Vengeance for Sale was adapted into a Kabuki in 2012.

Sukeroku is a yakuza, he makes a living by helping someone's revenge.

Cast

Source:
 Hiroyuki Sanada as Sukeroku
 Kyoka Suzuki as Osen
 Takehiro Murata as Tarō
 Shingo Tsurumi as Wakiya Shinkurō
 Tōru Kazama as Tsumaki Yunosuke
 Hirotarō Honda as Hotta
 Tomoi Tatsuhiko as Kurata
 Nana Yamamoto as Takeno
 Makoto Satō
 Naoto Takenaka
 Kyūsaku Shimada
 Hideyo Amamoto
 Kanzō Uni
 Hiroko Isayama
 Ittoku Kishibe as Sakakibara Oribe
 Kyōko Kishida as Otome
 Keijyu Kobayashi as Coffin craftsman
 Tatsuya Nakadai as Katakura Umetarō

Other Credits
 Masaya Nakamra - Executive producer
 Yoshinobu Nishioka - Art director

Honors

Mainichi Film Awards
Won:Best Leading Actor - Hiroyuki Sanada.

References

External links

Vengeance for Sale at Nikkatsu

2002 films
Films directed by Kihachi Okamoto
2000s Japanese-language films
Jidaigeki films
Samurai films
Films set in the Edo period
Live-action films based on manga
2000s Japanese films